The Catalonia Ladies Masters was a professional golf tournament on the Ladies European Tour that was held in Spain. It was first held in 2004 and dropped from the tour in 2008.

Karine Icher won the inaugural event on 17-under-par 190 with a score of 62-66-62 to break the existing record of 200 for a 54-hole LET event.

In 2007, Ashleigh Simon, at 18 years and 37 days, became the youngest ever professional winner of a Ladies European Tour event as she won at (−8) with 70-68-70.

The tournament was dropped from the tour in 2008 and was held as an unsanctioned Ladies European invitational event for 20 players. Rebecca Hudson, Paula Marti and Tania Elósegui finished 6 shots behind Lotta Wahlin

Winners

LET unofficial event

LET event

References

External links
Golf Today: LET Tournament Winners 1979–Present day
Where2Golf: Catalonia Ladies Masters

Former Ladies European Tour events
Golf tournaments in Spain